Kuzmenko is a Ukrainian-language patronymic surname derived from the given name Kuzma. Its Belarusian equivalent is Kuzmienka.

The surname may refer to:
 Andrei Kuzmenko (born 1996), Russian ice hockey player
 Andriy Kuzmenko (1968–2015), Ukrainian singer and poet
 Anna Kuzmenko (born 2004), French figure skater
 Halyna Kuzmenko (1896–1978), Ukrainian anarchist
 Igor Kuzmenko (born 1970), Russian footballer
 Ivan Kuzmenko (born 1995), Russian swimmer
 Larysa Kuzmenko (born 1956), Canadian composer
 Lizaveta Kuzmenka (born 1987), Belarusian alpine skier
 Serhiy Kuzmenko (born 1975), Ukrainian politician
 Valeria Kuzmenko Titova (1934–2010), Soviet-Ukrainian tennis player

See also
 

Ukrainian-language surnames
Surnames of Ukrainian origin
Patronymic surnames